Iran Federation of Sport Associations (IFSA) is the governing body for 21 minor sports in Iran.

Associations

References

IFSA